is a Japanese professional footballer who plays as an attacking midfielder for J1 League club Kashiwa Reysol.

Club statistics
.

References

External links
Profile at Kashiwa Reysol

1993 births
Living people
Ryutsu Keizai University alumni
Association football people from Chiba Prefecture
Japanese footballers
J1 League players
J2 League players
V-Varen Nagasaki players
Shimizu S-Pulse players
Kashiwa Reysol players
Association football midfielders